= Nelson Brass Academy =

The Nelson City Brass Youth Academy comprises 3 bands in the British Brass Band style, the Junior, Youth and Lake Rotoiti Bands in Nelson City Brass. The band was formed in August 2006. The Nelson City Brass Academy Band has over 10 members at present, playing in competitions and community events across the region and New Zealand.

Several Band members have gone on to take part in the New Zealand Secondary Schools and Youth Brass Bands.

In 2010 the youth band competed in their inaugural national Championships in Dunedin, entering in the youth and D grade. Along the way the band was lucky enough to be sponsored by Vivace instruments, which made a significant contribution to the band's ability to develop. The band has also received funding from the Canterbury Community Trust and Pub Charities in the past. The band was able to win Youth grade becoming National Champions in the process with 1st Trombone Fenella Deans winning the best soloist award. The band repeated this performance in 2012 in Timaru with 12-year-old cornet player Logan Ford taking away the soloist award and the band is preparing to repeat this feat in 2013 in New Plymouth. In 2011 the academy won the SOUNZ community commission project allowing them to have a piece composed especially for them by prominent New Zealand composer John Rimmer entitled Riffs 'n Ructions.
